Golan Hermon (born 26 September 1977) was an Israeli footballer (Defender) who currently works as a youth manager at Hapoel Katamon Jerusalem.

Career 
Hermon began his career in the youth club of Beitar Jerusalem and flighted to the elder team in 1996. He left after only one season to the city's rival club, Hapoel Jerusalem since he did not get much play in Beitar.

After a few good seasons in Hapoel, Hermon returned to Beitar in 2002, where he stayed for two years. In 2004, Golan moved to Maccabi Netanya, who at the time was playing in the second league and helped promote her to the premier league.  In his years at Netanya, the club finished twice in the second place and he participated with the team for the first time in the UEFA Cup. In 5 years with the club he played 149 games and scored 4 goals in all club competitions.

After 5 years with Netanya he left the club in June 2009 to Hapoel Ramat Gan.

On 28 May 2010 he joined Hapoel Haifa for one season. In July 2011 he extended his contract for another season.

After two seasons in Haifa he moved to Maccabi Umm al-Fahm. In October 2012 he had to leave the club after he was assaulted by the chairman of Umm al-Fahm.

On 26 December 2012 he joined Maccabi Yavne.

Honours 
 Israeli Premier League:
 Winner (1): 1996-97
Runner-up (2): 2006-07, 2007–08
Toto Cup (Leumit):
Winner (1): 2004-05

References

External links
 
 Article with Stats in Maccabi Netanya at Kufsa

Hapoel Katamon Jerusalem F.C. players
Maccabi Umm al-Fahm F.C. players
Hapoel Ramat Gan F.C. players
Hapoel Jerusalem F.C. players
Maccabi Netanya F.C. players
Beitar Jerusalem F.C. players
Maccabi Yavne F.C. players
Hapoel Haifa F.C. players
1977 births
Living people
Israeli settlers
Israeli footballers
Liga Leumit players
People from Geva Binyamin
Israeli Premier League players
Israeli people of Moroccan-Jewish descent
Association football defenders